Borate sulfates are mixed anion compounds containing separate borate and sulfate anions. They are distinct from the borosulfates where the borate is linked to a sulfate via a common oxygen atom.

List

References

Borate sulfates